The St Crispin Street Fair is a fair held periodically in the Market Square of Northampton, England. It is organised by Northampton Borough Council.

The event is a travelling funfair with over 100 amusement rides, usually operating on several days of the October half-term school holiday with the precise days varying from year to year. In 2012, shop owners raised concerns about how the new fair could affect their business during Hallowe'en weekend. In 2014, the fair was held from 25 to 29 October with a large part of it held on a nearby car park.

References

External links
 Northampton Borough Council, accessed 21 October 2012

Tourist attractions in Northampton
Street fairs
Fairs in England